Morgan Rewind: A Tribute To Lee Morgan, Vol. 1 is an album by jazz pianist Roberto Magris released on the JMood label in 2011, featuring performances by the Roberto Magris Quintet with Brandon Lee, Logan Richardson, Elisa Pruett and Albert “Tootie” Heath.

Reception

The All About Jazz review by Edward Blanco awarded the album 4½ stars and simply states: "Morgan Rewind is an impressive musical tribute to a legendary artist whose influence is still felt today. The whole band plays hot and heavy on this decidedly hard bop selection, containing firm stick play from Heath, tasty lines from the leader and hard blowing from the horns." The All About Jazz review by Jerry D’Souza awarded the album 4 stars and simply states: "It would have been facile to imitate the originals, but Magris gives the Morgan compositions fresh details and a sense of purpose making this a sincere tribute. With outstanding musicianship added to the mix, Morgan Rewind has many engaging pleasures." The New York City Jazz Record review by Donald Elfman simply states: "These players have the temperament, the sound and the passion to make these tunes come alive."

Track listing
 Croquet Ballet (Billy Harper) - 5:32 
 Party Time (Lee Morgan) - 8:29 
 Desert Moonlight (Lee Morgan) - 5:28 
 Lee-Too (Roberto Magris) - 5:56 
 Ceora (Lee Morgan) - 6:41 
 Hocus Pocus (Lee Morgan) - 6:55 
 Eclipso (Lee Morgan) - 6:12 
 Mr. Kenyatta (Lee Morgan) - 6:04 
 Lee Morganized (Roberto Magris) - 8:21 
 Audio Liner Notes - 12:03

Personnel

Musicians
Brandon Lee – trumpet
Logan Richardson – alto sax
Roberto Magris - piano
Elisa Pruett - bass
Albert “Tootie” Heath - drums

Production
 Paul Collins – executive producer and producer
 George Hunt – engineering
 Daria Lacy – design
 Jerry Lockett – photography

References

Roberto Magris albums
2011 albums